Methylidynephosphane (phosphaethyne) is a chemical compound which was the first phosphaalkyne compound discovered, containing the unusual C≡P carbon-phosphorus triple bond.

Description
Methylidynephosphane is the phosphorus analogue of hydrogen cyanide, with the nitrile nitrogen replaced by phosphorus.  Methylidynephosphane can be synthesised via the reaction of phosphine with carbon, but it is extremely reactive and polymerises readily at temperatures above −120 °C.  However, several types of derivatives, with bulky groups, such as tert-butyl or trimethylsilyl, substituted for the hydrogen atom, are much more stable, and are useful reagents for the synthesis of various organophosphorus compounds.  The PCO− and PCS− anions are also known.

History
While the existence of the molecule had been discussed, and early attempts had been made to prepare it, methylidynephosphane was first successfully synthesised in 1961, by T.E. Gier of E. I. duPont de Nemours, Inc. Earlier reports of preparing its sodium salt were reported as unreproducible by this author. Methylidynephosphane may have contributed to an explosion that killed Vera Bogdanovskaia, an early chemist pursuing it, one of the first female chemists in Russia, and perhaps the first to die as a result of her own research.

References

Organophosphanes